In mathematics, the Schwartz kernel theorem is a foundational result in the theory of generalized functions, published by Laurent Schwartz in 1952. It states, in broad terms, that the generalized functions introduced by Schwartz (Schwartz distributions) have a two-variable theory that includes all reasonable bilinear forms on the space  of test functions. The space  itself consists of smooth functions of compact support.

Statement of the theorem
Every distribution  defines a
continuous linear map  such that

for every .
Conversely, for every such continuous linear map 
there exists one and only one distribution  such that holds.
The distribution  is the kernel of the map .

Note 

Given a distribution  one can always write the linear map K informally as

so that 
.

Integral kernels

The point of the theorem is to assert that the extended class of operators can be characterised abstractly, as containing all operators subject to a minimum continuity condition. A bilinear form on  arises by pairing the image distribution with a test function.

A simple example is that the natural embedding of the test function space  into  - sending every test function  into the corresponding distribution  - corresponds to the delta distribution

concentrated at the diagonal of the underlined Euclidean space, in terms of the Dirac delta function . While this is at most an observation, it shows how the distribution theory adds to the scope.

This result implies that the formation of distributions has a major property of 'closure' within the traditional domain of functional analysis. It was interpreted (comment of Jean Dieudonné) as a strong verification of the suitability of the Schwartz theory of distributions to mathematical analysis more widely seen. In his Éléments d'analyse volume 7, p. 3 he notes that the theorem includes differential operators on the same footing as integral operators, and concludes that it is perhaps the most important modern result of functional analysis. He goes on immediately to qualify that statement, saying that the setting is too 'vast' for differential operators, because of the property of monotonicity with respect to the support of a function, which is evident for differentiation. Even monotonicity with respect to singular support is not characteristic of the general case; its consideration leads in the direction of the contemporary theory of pseudo-differential operators.

Smooth manifolds 

Dieudonné proves a version of the Schwartz result valid for smooth manifolds, and additional supporting results, in sections 23.9 to 23.12 of that book.

Generalization to nuclear spaces 
We have the following generalization of the theorem. 

Equivalently, v is of the form, 
  for all 

See also

References

Bibliography
 
 .

External links

 

Generalized functions
Transforms
Theorems in functional analysis
Topological tensor products
Schwartz distributions